The 2021 end of year rugby union tests, also referred to as the Autumn internationals in the Northern Hemisphere, were rugby union test matches during October and November 2021, mainly involving countries from the Northern Hemisphere hosting those from the Southern Hemisphere. These international games counted towards World Rugby's ranking system, with teams typically playing from two to four matches in this period.

Matches hosted by teams from the Six Nations Championship were branded the Autumn Nations Series for marketing purposes.

Fixtures

23 October

Notes:
 Ben Gunter, Dylan Riley (both Japan) and Connal McInerney (Australia) made their international debuts.
 Yoshitaka Tokunaga replaced Michael Leitch on the bench for Japan, after Leitch withdrew due to injury.

Notes:
 Chad Gough, Ryan James, Fakaʻosi Pifeleti (all United States) and Josh Lord (New Zealand) made their international debuts.
 New Zealand recorded their biggest win over the United States.
 This was the United States' biggest-ever loss.
 This was the first time New Zealand scored 100 or more points in multiple games in the same calendar year, having scored 102 against Tonga in June.

30 October

Notes:
 Luke Crosbie, Jamie Dobie, Jamie Hodgson, Rufus McLean, Pierre Schoeman, Marshall Sykes, Ross Thompson, Sione Tuipulotu (all Scotland), Setefano Funaki, Navarre Haisila, Tanginoa Halaifonua, Atu Manu, Maile Ngauamo, Loni Uhila and Vaea Vaea (all Tonga) made their international debuts.
 Scotland recorded their biggest win over Tonga, surpassing the 36-point difference set during the 1995 Rugby World Cup.
 Kyle Steyn became the first Scottish player to score four tries at Murrayfield and the first since Gavin Hastings against Ivory Coast at the 1995 Rugby World Cup.
 Tonga played at Murrayfield for the first time since 2001.

Notes:
 Ken Owens (Wales) was named to start but withdrew shortly after the team announcement after failing a late fitness test; Ryan Elias replaced Owens in the starting XV and Kirby Myhill took Elias's place on the bench.
 Alun Wyn Jones (Wales) earned his 149th test cap to become the most capped international player (excluding Lions tests), surpassing Richie McCaw's record.
 Kirby Myhill (Wales) made his international debut.
 Beauden Barrett became the 11th New Zealand player to earn 100 test caps.
 New Zealand's 54 points scored were the most they had scored away to Wales, and the 38-point margin equalled New Zealand's largest winning margin when away to Wales.

6/7 November

Notes:
 Dan Sheehan (Ireland) made his international debut.
 Johnny Sexton became the seventh Ireland player to earn his 100th test cap.

Notes:
 Ivan Nemer (Italy) made his international debut.
 New Zealand broke the record for the most points scored in a calendar year (675), surpassing the 658 points scored by South Africa in 2007.

Notes:
 Peter Nelson (Canada) was named to start but withdrew after the captain's run and was replaced by Robbie Povey, who was replaced on the bench by Lockie Kratz. Tyler Rowland was also named on the bench but withdrew due to injury and was replaced by Foster DeWitt.
 André Arrojado (Portugal) made his international debut.
 This was Portugal's first win over Canada.

Notes:
 Jerry Davoibaravi, Santiago Ovejero (both Spain), Vilimoni Botitu, Masivesi Dakuwaqa, Henry Spring, Aminiasi Tuimaba and Jiuta Wainiqolo (all Fiji) made their international debuts.
 Fiji became Spain's highest-ranked opponent at home since Spain hosted Australia in 2001.

Notes:
 Owen Farrell was initially named to start at fly-half but was ruled out before the match after a positive COVID-19 test; George Furbank replaced Farrell at fly-half, and Mark Atkinson took Furbank's place among the replacements.
 Mark Atkinson, Alex Mitchell (both England), Solomone Kata and Afusipa Taumoepeau (both Tonga) made their international debuts.
 Lopeti Timani (Tonga) made his Tongan international debut having previously represented Australia.

Notes:
 WillGriff John and Bradley Roberts (Wales) made their international debuts.
 South Africa won in Wales for the first time since 2013 and reclaimed the Prince William Cup.

Notes:
 Thibaud Flament (France) made his international debut.

Notes:
 Alexandru Alexe, Tudor Butnariu, Damian Strătilă, Dorin Tică, Jason Tomane, Hinckley Vaovasa (all Romania) and Baltazar Amaya (Uruguay) made their international debuts.

Notes:
 Ewan Ashman, Josh Bayliss (both Scotland) and Izaia Perese (Australia) made their international debuts.
 Scotland retained the Hopetoun Cup.
 Scotland won a third consecutive match against Australia for the first time since 1982.
 Romain Poite retired from refereeing test rugby following this game

13/14 November

Notes:
 Alessandro Fusco, Giovanni Pettinelli (both Italy) and Ignacio Calles (Argentina) made their international debuts.

Notes:
 Jesse Kriel and Franco Mostert (both South Africa) won their 50th caps.
 Stuart Hogg equalled Ian Smith and Tony Stanger's record as Scotland's all time top try scorer with 24 tries.

Notes:
 Brock Webster (Canada) was named to start but withdrew before the game and was replaced by Robbie Povey, who was replaced on the bench by David Richard.
 Michael Abrahams, Hugues Bastin, Toon Deceuninck, Henri Dequenne, Frédéric De Smet, Ian Dumez, Viktor Pazgrat, Basile Poupaert, Matias Remue, Hugo Ruelle, Basile Van Parys (all Belgium), Foster DeWitt, Isaac Olson and David Richard (all Canada) made their international debuts.

Notes:
 Henry Chavancy (French Barbarians) had been named to start but was replaced by Arthur Bonneval ahead of kick-off, with Alexandre Tchaptchet replacing Bonneval on the bench.

Notes:
 Geoffrey Moïse (Portugal) had been named on the bench but withdrew ahead of kick-off and replaced by André Arrojado.
 Warner Dearns and Shogo Nakano (both Japan) made their international debuts.
 This was the first meeting between the two nations.

Notes:
 Ellis Genge was initially named to start but was ruled out before the match after a positive COVID-19 test; Bevan Rodd replaced Genge at loosehead, and Trevor Davison took Rodd's place among the replacements.
 Raffi Quirke, Bevan Rodd (both England) and Ollie Hoskins (Australia) made their international debuts.
 Maro Itoje (England) won his 50th international cap.
 Owen Farrell became the third England player to earn his 100th international cap; 94 for England and 6 for the British & Irish Lions.
 Jamie Blamire became the first English forward to score a try in four consecutive matches.
 England retained the Cook Cup.

Notes:
 Henrique Ferreira, Kauã Guimarães, Pedro Henrique, Devon Müller, Gabriel Quirino (all Brazil), Tapiwa Mafura, Victor Mapunga and Tapiwa Tsomondo (all Zimbabwe) made their international debuts.
 This was the first meeting between the two sides.

Notes:
 Matthis Lebel and Maxime Lucu (both France) made their international debuts.
 This was the first time these two teams had met outside a Rugby World Cup.

Notes:
 Danco Burger, Jayden Bussel, Lorenzo Louis, Gerhard Opperman, Herschell van Wyk (all Namibia) and Brian Wahinya (Kenya) made their international debuts.

Notes:
 Josh Adams and Tomas Francis were initially named to start but were ruled out before the match due to injury; WillGriff John replaced Francis at tighthead, and Nick Tompkins replaced Adams at outside centre; Dillon Lewis and Willis Halaholo replaced John and Tompkins on the bench.
 Christ Tshiunza (Wales), Apisai Naqalevu and Zuriel Togiatama (both Fiji) made their international debuts.

20/21 November

Notes:
 Robson Morais and Joel Ramírez (both Brazil) made their international debuts.

Notes:
 Ivan Chepraga (Russia) made his international debut.
 This was Chile's first win over Russia.

Notes:
 Dylan Richardson and Javan Sebastian (both Scotland) made their international debuts.
 Stuart Hogg became Scotland's all-time top try scorer, surpassing Ian Smith and Tony Stanger's record of 24 tries.

Notes:
 Pierre Bruno, Hame Faiva, Iliesa Ratuva Tavuyara (all Italy), Juan Manuel Alonso and Mateo Viñals (both Uruguay) made their international debuts.

Notes:
 Chemigan Beukes (Namibia) made his international debut.
 Namibia won the Stellenbosch Challenge Cup.

Notes:
 This was the first draw between the two nations.

Notes:
 Nic Dolly (England) made his international debut.

Notes:
 Bogdan Doroftei, Sioeli Lama, Andrei Toader (all Romania) and Latu Latunipulu (Tonga) made their international debuts.
 Ionuț Dumitru (Romania) earned his 50th test cap.

Notes:
 Lalakai Foketi (Australia) made his international debut.
 Wales retained the James Bevan Trophy for the first time.
 Wales won three consecutive matches against Australia for the first time since 1975.

Notes:
 France regained the Dave Gallaher Trophy.
 This was France's first win over New Zealand since 2009.
 This was France's first win over New Zealand on home soil since 2000.
 France set a new record for their highest winning margin over the All Blacks.
 France went undefeated in an Autumn internationals campaign for the first time since 2012.
 New Zealand's defeat meant this was the first time since November 2002 that South Africa, Australia and New Zealand had all been defeated on the same day.

Notes:
 Iain Henderson and Jack Conan (both Ireland) were both named to start, but withdrew ahead of the game and were replaced by Ryan Baird and Peter O'Mahony, with Doris moving to Number 8. Nick Timoney came onto the bench to replace O'Mahony.
 Facundo Cordero (Argentina) made his international debut.
 Ireland scored their most points against Argentina and set a new record for their largest winning margin over the Pumas.
 Tomás Lavanini (Argentina) became the first player to be shown three red cards in his international career.

26/27 November

Notes:
 Gleb Farkov, Bogdan Kireev, Pavel Kirillov, Kirill Panarin, Viktor Telnov (all Russia), Lukas Carvallo, Diego Escobar and Santiago Pedrero (all Chile) made their international debuts.
 This was Chile's biggest winning margin over Russia.

See also
 2021 July rugby union tests
 2021 World Rugby Americas Pacific Challenge
 2021–22 Rugby Europe season
 Toyota Challenge

Notes

References

2021
End-of-year rugby union internationals
End-of-year rugby union internationals